Marlin Cannon (born December 9, 1970) is an American retired sprinter.

References

1970 births
Living people
American male sprinters
Universiade medalists in athletics (track and field)
Place of birth missing (living people)
Barton Cougars men's track and field athletes
Universiade gold medalists for the United States
Medalists at the 1991 Summer Universiade